Prairie Public Television is a state network of public television stations operated primarily by Prairie Public Broadcasting. It comprises all of the PBS member stations in the U.S. state of North Dakota.

The state network is available via flagship station KFME in Fargo and eight satellite stations covering all of North Dakota, plus portions of Minnesota, Montana, and South Dakota. It also has substantial viewership in portions of the Canadian provinces of Manitoba, Saskatchewan and Ontario. PPT is also available on most satellite and cable television outlets serving North Dakota.

Prairie Public Television is headquartered on 5th Street North in Fargo, with a satellite studio on North 15th Street in Bismarck.

History

In 1959, North Central Educational Television, the predecessor organization to Prairie Public, was incorporated. On January 19, 1964, KFME signed on from Fargo as North Dakota's first educational television station.

The Prairie Public name was adopted in 1974, the same year the first satellite station, KGFE in Grand Forks, signed on, marking the beginning of the statewide network. A year earlier, KFME had almost shut down due to lack of funding. KFME acquired a color video tape recorder in 1967, and color cameras in 1975.

The FCC had allocated educational frequencies to Bismarck, Minot, Williston and Dickinson in the 1960s. While KFME was picked up on cable in Bismarck in the early 1970s, most of the western part of the state was one of the few areas of the country without educational programming. It would be 1977 before the state legislature granted Prairie Public funding to build a statewide public television network. KBME in Bismarck was established in 1979, bringing over-the-air public television to the western portion of the state for the first time. KSRE in Minot followed suit in 1980 and KDSE in 1982. Prairie Public purchased the Fargo American Life Building in 1983 and moved its studios there in 1984. In 1989 KFME and cable feeds went to a 24-hour television broadcast schedule. The Prairie Satellite Network distance education state network, with 70 sites, was completed in 1994. Later, KWSE in Williston signed on in 1983, and KJRE in Ellendale/Jamestown signed on in 1992.

Prairie Public became the first broadcaster in North Dakota to broadcast in high definition, with KFME-DT and KBME-DT debuting in 2002. Digital-only station KCGE-DT Crookston/Grand Forks signed on in 2003, with the rest of the Prairie Public stations broadcasting in HDTV by 2004.

The transmitter for KGFE on the WDAZ-TV tower mast was damaged in May 2004, due to ice buildup on the tower, which caused very large chunks of ice to fall off and go through the roof of the transmitter building. This caused water damage to the transmitter's equipment, as well as damage to the roof of the transmitter site. KGFE went back on the air in February 2005 at low power, then later became a secondary station from the KCGE tower. KMDE-DT of Devils Lake signed on in 2005 to cover the western half of KGFE's viewing area, as KCGE covered the eastern half of KGFE's viewing area.

Manitoba
Prairie Public is carried on most cable systems in southern Manitoba, including Winnipeg. Manitoba has historically been a significant supporter of Prairie Public. Indeed, the network's audience there is far larger than its American one; the Winnipeg area alone has a population greater than the entire state of North Dakota.

Prairie Public has produced numerous local documentaries, including many about southern Manitoba, including Portage Avenue: Dreams of Castles in the Sky, Red River Divide, Assiniboine Park: A Park for all Seasons, Lake Winnipeg's Paradise Beaches, among others.

Prairie Public was first available in Manitoba in 1974, when KGFE signed on VHF channel 2 from the WDAZ TV Tower in Dahlen, its signal was easily received in the Morden-Winkler area. Prairie Public has been carried on cable in Manitoba since 1975, when KGFE was picked up by cable systems in Winnipeg and Brandon, Manitoba. In 1986, Prairie Public was nearly dropped from cable in Winnipeg. After the crisis, Prairie Public set up a fixed microwave link to carry stronger signals into Winnipeg. In 1998, a signal link failure forced PPTV off cable in Brandon for several months.

Not only must Prairie Public take its large Canadian audience into account in its programming, but a significant portion of its donations during fundraising drives are in Canadian dollars. The station has opened up many of its contests for Canadian residents. It is also involved in many family events in Manitoba, including the International Friendship Festival in Winnipeg, and an annual Mister Rogers' Neighborhood Sweater Drive.

Canadians are well-represented in Prairie Public's leadership; two directors of Prairie Public are from Winnipeg. Additionally, a Manitoban chairs the television programming advisory board.

Since KGFE's analog service went off the air in 2004, Prairie Public has been available only by cable in Manitoba. In 2012, MTS brought Prairie Public's signal into northern Manitoba for the first time when its Ultimate TV service launched in Thompson and The Pas. Coverage is not complete, however; cable systems as far south as Winkler use alternate PBS feeds. Prairie Public is also absent from the lineups of satellite providers Shaw Direct and Bell Satellite TV, making it unavailable to many rural residents and cottages.

Elsewhere in Canada, Prairie Public is carried on cable in Kenora, Ontario, and is available over-the-air near Estevan, Saskatchewan. Prairie Public was formerly on cable throughout Saskatchewan, until 1984. Cable companies in Saskatchewan largely carry Detroit Public Television instead, while SaskTel carries WGBH.

Programming
Many original Prairie Public productions are available on the broadcaster's YouTube Channel. The stations also carry programs from PBS, American Public Television, and other distributors, as well as from independent producers.

Local
Current programs
 Prairie Pulse with John Harris
 Prairie Mosaic
 Prairie Musicians
 Painting with Paulson

Archives
Weekly regional programs
 SPIN (1976)
 North Dakota This Week (1980)
 Skyline (early 1980s)
 Prairie News Journal (1990–1997)
 PlainsTalk (1998) 
 Prairie Pulse (2004–present)

Regional
As a member of Minnesota Public Television Association Prairie Public also broadcasts Almanac from Twin Cities PBS in Minneapolis–Saint Paul, as well as Minnesota Channel on Prairie Public's digital channels throughout North Dakota.

Stations

Full-power stations
There are nine full-power stations in the state network, in major cities throughout the state. In 2009, the state network ended analog service for all stations, and they map via PSIP to their former analog channel location.

Notes:
1. Aside from their transmitters, the network's stations (except KFME and KBME-TV) do not maintain any physical presence in their cities of license.
2. KGFE used the callsign KLHZ during its construction permit from 1973 to 1974.
3. KBME-TV used the callsign KBME (without the -TV suffix) from its 1979 sign-on until 1998.
4. The Broadcasting and Cable Yearbook says KJRE signed on May 12, while the Television and Cable Factbook says it signed on May 11.

Digital television

Digital channels
The digital signals of PPT's stations are multiplexed:

In most areas, subchannels are only available in standard definition. However, Minnesota Channel is carried in high definition by KGFE Grand Forks, as the only other subchannel is a standard definition feed of the main PPT/PBS channel. All four Prairie Public subchannels and the high definition feed of the main PPT/PBS channel are carried on KCGE in the Grand Forks area.

Analog-to-digital conversion
During 2009, in the lead-up to the analog-to-digital television transition that would ultimately occur on June 12, Prairie Public shut down the analog transmitters of its stations on a staggered basis. Listed below are the dates each analog transmitter ceased operations as well as their post-transition channel allocations:
 KFME shut down its analog signal, over VHF channel 13, on June 12, 2009, the official date in which full-power television stations in the United States transitioned from analog to digital broadcasts under federal mandate. The station's digital signal relocated from its pre-transition UHF channel 23 to VHF channel 13.
 KGFE shut down its analog signal, over VHF channel 2, on June 12, 2009. The station's digital signal relocated from its pre-transition UHF channel 56, which was among the high band UHF channels (52-69) that were removed from broadcasting use as a result of the transition, to UHF channel 15. Through the use of PSIP, digital television receivers display the station's virtual channel as its former VHF analog channel 2.
 KBME-TV shut down its analog signal, over VHF channel 3, on February 17, 2009, the original date in which full-power television stations in the United States were to transition from analog to digital broadcasts under federal mandate (which was later pushed back to June 12, 2009). The station's digital signal remained on its pre-transition UHF channel 22. Through the use of PSIP, digital television receivers display the station's virtual channel as its former VHF analog channel 3.
 KSRE shut down its analog signal, over VHF channel 6, on February 17, 2009. The station's digital signal remained on its pre-transition UHF channel 40. Through the use of PSIP, digital television receivers display the station's virtual channel as its former VHF analog channel 6.
 KDSE shut down its analog signal, over VHF channel 9, on June 12, 2009. The station's digital signal relocated from its pre-transition UHF channel 20 to VHF channel 9.
 KWSE shut down its analog signal, over VHF channel 4, on June 12, 2009. The station's digital signal remained on its pre-transition UHF channel 51. Through the use of PSIP, digital television receivers display the station's virtual channel as its former VHF analog channel 4.
 KJRE shut down its analog signal, over UHF channel 19, on February 17, 2009. The station's digital signal remained on its pre-transition UHF channel 20. Through the use of PSIP, digital television receivers display the station's virtual channel as its former UHF analog channel 19.

KCGE-DT signed on in 2003 as a digital-only station, although it also had to endure a temporary shutdown in early 2009 in final preparation for the transition.

KMDE signed on in 2006 as a digital-only station, although it also had to endure a temporary shutdown in early 2009 in final preparation for the transition.

Network translator stations
A translator network also serves areas where over-the-air reception for a regular station is hindered by area topography, distance and to fill in holes between full-power stations. Translators broadcasting in digital have their virtual channel mapped via PSIP to the channel number of the full-power station it rebroadcasts.

 Formerly, 
K02FO Valley City, relaying KGFE until 1992, when KJRE 19 in Ellendale signed on.
K07NE Lisbon relayed KFME.
K11QD Hazen relayed KSRE.

Cable and satellite
Prairie Public is carried on all cable systems in North Dakota, as well as on a number of cable systems in northwestern Minnesota and eastern Montana. In Manitoba, Prairie Public is carried by Shaw Cable on most systems south of the Interlake (including Winnipeg), and by Westman across southwest Manitoba. MTS carries Prairie Public on their phone-line service, MTS TV. In Ontario, Shaw Cable carries Prairie Public in Kenora.

On satellite, KFME is carried on the Fargo/Grand Forks DirecTV and Dish Network local feeds, while KBME is carried on the Bismarck/Minot/Williston/Dickinson DirecTV and Dish Network feeds.

See also
Prairie Public Radio

External links
Prairie Public Broadcasting website
Prairie Public Productions
Online Videos A-Z Index
YouTube RSS feed
Over-the-air coverage map from RabbitEars.info

References 

PBS member networks
PBS member stations
Television stations in North Dakota
Television channels and stations established in 1964
1964 establishments in North Dakota